White butterfly may refer to:

Biology
 Pierinae, a subfamily of butterflies commonly called the whites
 Pieris, a genus of Pierinae commonly called the whites or garden whites
 Appias, another genus of Pierinae sometimes called the whites
 Pontia, a third genus of Pierinae sometimes called the whites
 Pieris rapae, a species also called the small white or small cabbage white

Culture
 White Butterfly (album), the second album from English rock band InMe
 Safe in a Room/White Butterfly, an EP from English rock band InMe
 Caught: White Butterfly, a 2006 live album from English rock band InMe
 White Butterfly (novel), an "Easy Rawlins" detective mystery novel by Walter Mosley

Animal common name disambiguation pages